Millery is a commune in the Meurthe-et-Moselle department in north-eastern France.

History 
During World War II, on Saturday, 29 July 1944, an RAF Avro Lancaster Type B III bomber (s/n ND756 AA°M), while on a mission to the German city of Stuttgart, was shot down by Luftwaffe night fighters and crashed at 1:25 a.m. on the Falaise hill near Millery. Out of the seven crew members, four died — including three from New Zealand and one British — and were buried in the village cemetery, where their graves can still be seen.

See also
Communes of the Meurthe-et-Moselle department

References

Communes of Meurthe-et-Moselle